Zhuquan Town is a town and the county seat in the south western Jiahe County, Hunan, China. The town was reformed through the amalgamation of Panjiang Township and 12 villages of the former Zhuquan Town on November 27, 2015.

References

Jiahe
County seats in Hunan
Towns of Chenzhou